The winter solstice, also called the hibernal solstice, occurs when either of Earth's poles reaches its maximum tilt away from the Sun. This happens twice yearly, once in each hemisphere (Northern and Southern). For that hemisphere, the winter solstice is the day with the shortest period of daylight and longest night of the year, when the Sun is at its lowest daily maximum elevation in the sky. Either pole experiences continuous darkness or twilight around its winter solstice. The opposite event is the summer solstice.

The winter solstice occurs during the hemisphere's winter. In the Northern Hemisphere, this is the December solstice (usually 21st or 22nd December) and in the Southern Hemisphere, this is the June solstice (usually 20th or 21st of June). Although the winter solstice itself lasts only a moment, the term also refers to the day on which it occurs.  The term midwinter is also used synonymously with the winter solstice, although it carries other meanings as well. Traditionally, in many temperate regions, the winter solstice is seen as the middle of winter; although today in some countries and calendars it is seen as the beginning of winter. Other names are the "extreme of winter" (Dongzhi), or the "shortest day".

Since prehistory, the winter solstice has been a significant time of year in many cultures and has been marked by festivals and rituals. It marked the symbolic death and rebirth of the Sun; the gradual waning of daylight hours is reversed and begins to grow again. Some ancient monuments such as Newgrange, Stonehenge, and Cahokia Woodhenge are aligned with the sunrise or sunset on the winter solstice.

History and cultural significance 

The solstice may have been a special moment of the annual cycle for some cultures even during Neolithic times. Astronomical events were often used to guide activities, such as the mating of animals, the sowing of crops and the monitoring of winter reserves of food. Many cultural mythologies and traditions are derived from this. The winter solstice was immensely important because the people were economically dependent on monitoring the progress of the seasons. Starvation was common during the first months of the winter, January to April (northern hemisphere) or July to October (southern hemisphere), also known as "the famine months". In temperate climates, the midwinter festival was the last feast celebration, before deep winter began. Most cattle were slaughtered so they would not have to be fed during the winter, so it was almost the only time of year when a plentiful supply of fresh meat was available.

Because the winter solstice is the reversal of the sun's ebbing in the sky, in ancient times it was seen as the symbolic death and rebirth of the sun or of a sun god. In cultures which used cyclic calendars based on the winter solstice, the "year as reborn" was celebrated with reference to life-death-rebirth deities or "new beginnings" (such as Hogmanay's redding, a New Year cleaning tradition), and "reversal" (as in Saturnalia's slave and master reversals).

Neolithic Age
Some important Neolithic and early Bronze Age archaeological sites in Europe are associated with the winter solstice, such as Stonehenge in England and Newgrange in Ireland. The primary axes of both of these monuments seem to have been carefully aligned on a sight-line pointing to the winter solstice sunrise (Newgrange) and the winter solstice sunset (Stonehenge). It is significant that at Stonehenge the Great Trilithon was oriented outwards from the middle of the monument, i.e. its smooth flat face was turned towards the midwinter Sun.

East Asian

In East Asia, the winter solstice has been celebrated as one of the Twenty-four Solar Terms, called Dongzhi (冬至) in Chinese. In Japan, in order not to catch cold in the winter, there is a custom to soak oneself in a yuzu hot bath ( = Yuzuyu).

Germanic

The pagan Scandinavian and Germanic people of northern Europe celebrate a winter holiday called Yule (also called Jul, Julblot, jólablót). The Heimskringla, written in the 13th century by the Icelander Snorri Sturluson, describes a Yule feast hosted by the Norwegian king Haakon the Good (c. 920–961). According to Snorri, the Christian Haakon had moved Yule from "midwinter" and aligned it with the Christian Christmas celebration. Historically, this has made some scholars believe that Yule originally was a sun festival on the winter solstice. Modern scholars generally do not believe this, as midwinter in medieval Iceland was a date about four weeks after the solstice.

Indian

Makara Sankranti, also known as Makara Sankrānti (Sanskrit: मकर संक्रांति) or Maghi, is a festival day in the Hindu calendar, in reference to deity Surya (sun). It is observed each year in January. It marks the first day of Sun's transit into Makara (Capricorn), marking the end of the month with the winter solstice and the start of longer days. In India, this occasion, known as Ayan Parivartan (Sanskrit: अयन परिवर्तन), is celebrated by religious Hindus as a holy day, with Hindus performing customs such as bathing in holy rivers, giving alms and donations, praying to deities and doing other holy deeds.

Iranian

Iranian people celebrate the night of the Northern Hemisphere's winter solstice as, "Yalda night", which is known to be the "longest and darkest night of the year". Yalda night celebration, or as some call it "Shabe Chelleh" ("the 40th night"), is one of the oldest Iranian traditions that has been present in Persian culture from ancient times. In this night all the family gather together, usually at the house of the eldest, and celebrate it by eating, drinking and reciting poetry (esp. Hafez). Nuts, pomegranates and watermelons are particularly served during this festival.

Judaic
An Aggadic legend found in tractate Avodah Zarah 8a puts forth the talmudic hypothesis that Adam first established the tradition of fasting before the winter solstice, and rejoicing afterward, which festival later developed into the Roman Saturnalia and Kalendae.

Roman

Sol Invictus ("The Unconquered Sun/Invincible Sun") was originally a Syrian god who was later adopted as the chief god of the Roman Empire under Emperor Aurelian. His holiday is traditionally celebrated on December 25, as are several gods associated with the winter solstice in many pagan traditions. It has been speculated to be the reason behind Christmas' proximity to the solstice.

Observation 
Although the instant of the solstice can be calculated, direct observation of the moment by visual perception is elusive. The Sun moves too slowly or appears to stand still (the meaning of "solstice"). However, by use of astronomical data tracking, the precise timing of its occurrence is now public knowledge. One cannot directly detect the precise instant of the solstice (by definition, one cannot observe that an object has stopped moving until one later observes that it has not moved further from the preceding spot, or that it has moved in the opposite direction). Furthermore, to be precise to a single day, one must be able to observe a change in azimuth or elevation less than or equal to about 1/60 of the angular diameter of the Sun. Observing that it occurred within a two-day period is easier, requiring an observation precision of only about 1/16 of the angular diameter of the Sun. Thus, many observations are of the day of the solstice rather than the instant. This is often done by observing sunrise and sunset or using an astronomically aligned instrument that allows a ray of light to be cast on a certain point around that time. The earliest sunset and latest sunrise dates differ from winter solstice, however, and these depend on latitude, due to the variation in the solar day throughout the year caused by the Earth's elliptical orbit (see earliest and latest sunrise and sunset).

Holidays celebrated on the winter solstice

Shabe Yalda (Iran)
Alban Arthan (Welsh)
Blue Christmas (holiday) (Western Christian)
Brumalia (Ancient Rome)
Dongzhi Festival (East Asia)
Koliada and Korochun (Slavic)
Midwinter Day (Antarctica)
Sanghamitta Day (Theravada Buddhism)
Shalako (Zuni)
Yaldā (Western and Central Asia)
Yule in the Northern Hemisphere (Germanic)
Ziemassvētki (ancient Latvia)

Other related festivals
 Cejna Êzî/Êzîd (Yazidi): Feast of Êzîd – Celebrated on the last Friday before winter solstice
 Inti Raymi (Inca)
 Saturnalia (Ancient Rome): Celebrated shortly before winter solstice
 Saint Lucy's Day (Christian): Used to coincide with the winter solstice day
 Cold Food Festival (Korea, Greater China): 105 days after winter solstice
 Makar Sankranti (India): Harvest Festival – Marks the end of the cold months and start of the new Month with longer days.
 Winter at Tantora Festival (Saudi Arabia): Cultural festival marking the beginning of the winter harvest season.

See also 

 Burning the Clocks
 Christmas in July
 Effect of Sun angle on climate
 Festival of Lights (disambiguation)
 Festive ecology
 Festivus
 Halcyon days
 Hanukkah
 HumanLight
 Koliada
 Kwanzaa
 Lohri
 Midsummer
 Summer solstice
 Thai Pongal
 Tekufah 
 Tirgan

References

Further reading

External links 
 Table of times/dates from 1600–2400

Astronomical events
December observances
June observances
International observances
solstice
solstice

de:Sonnenwende#Wintersonnenwende